A praisepit is a colloquial name given to a mosh pit which occurs at a pentecostal Christian church service.

The phrase was first coined in the late 1990s at the Planetshakers conference in Adelaide, South Australia, as a response to criticisms within the church regarding the increasingly secularised manner of youth worship activities.

Since then, the term has entered popular usage among young Australian pentecostal Christians, with some major west Australian conferences like Festivale and Phenomena using the word heavily in advertising.

References

Pentecostalism in Australia
Syllabus-free dance